Hair Today, Gone Tomorrow is the title of several cartoons:
Season 4, Episode 40 of The Harveytoons Show
Season 11, Episode 211 of King of the Hill
Season 2, Episode 7 of Shaun the Sheep
"Hair Today, Gone Tomorrow", a 2007 short cartoon from Foster's Home for Imaginary Friends
Season 1, Episode 19 of Middlemost Post

See also
 Hare Today, Gone Tomorrow